Loizides is a surname. Notable people with the surname include:

 Athena Loizides (born 1965), Cypriot television presenter, and food writer
 Louis Loizides, one of the founders of the bachata movement in the Dominican Republic
 Marios Loizides (1928–1988), Cypriot visual artist
 Panayiotis Loizides (footballer) (born 1995), Cypriot footballer
 Panayiotis Loizides (businessman), Cypriot businessman
 Tom Loizides (born 1988), English-born Cypriot rugby player